The Morshead Baronetcy, of Trenant Park in the County of Cornwall, was a title in the Baronetage of Great Britain. It was created on 22 January 1784 for John Morshead, Member of Parliament for Callington and Bodmin and Lord Warden of the Stannaries. The title became extinct on the death of the third Baronet in 1905.

Morshead baronets, of Trenant Park (1784)

Sir John Morshead, 1st Baronet (1747–1813)
Sir Frederick Treise Morshead, 2nd Baronet (1783–1828)
Sir Warwick Charles Morshead, 3rd Baronet (1824–1905)

References

Extinct baronetcies in the Baronetage of Great Britain